Virginia DuPuy was from 2005 until 2010 the mayor of Waco, Texas.   She attends Central Presbyterian Church and is also the CEO of DuPuy Oxygen, a Waco-based company.  She is married to Les DuPuy.

DuPuy received both her Bachelor of Arts from Baylor University in 1957 and her Master of Arts degree in 1961 from Baylor as well.

She married Leslie Carr DuPuy, Jr. in 1959.

Dupuy was reelected mayor in a landslide election in May 2008 in which she received over six times as many votes as the challenger.  After re-election, DuPuy expressed her plans for the upcoming years as mayor to the Waco Tribune-Herald:
“I’m looking forward to another two years and being a part of what’s going on in Waco. I plan on seeing continued development in downtown Waco and along the Brazos River Corridor. I’m looking forward to the overall development plans from the dam back up to the mammoth site. We hope to get started on that this year.”

She said she sees opportunities for the city to work with local colleges and hospitals to help develop a biotechnology industry in Waco.

References

Mayors of Waco, Texas
Women mayors of places in Texas
Living people
Baylor University alumni
Year of birth missing (living people)
21st-century American women